Bolivar is an unincorporated community in Chester Township, Wabash County, in the U.S. state of Indiana.

History

Bolivar was founded as a railroad junction, and was not officially platted. A post office was established at Bolivar in 1886, and remained in operation until it was discontinued in 1898. The community most likely was named after Simón Bolívar.

Geography

References

Unincorporated communities in Wabash County, Indiana
Unincorporated communities in Indiana